Filodrillia ordinata is a species of sea snail, a marine gastropod mollusk in the family Borsoniidae.

Description
The height of the shell attains 7.7 mm.

Distribution
This marine species is endemic to Australia and occurs off New South Wales, Tasmania and Victoria

References

 Laseron, C. 1954. Revision of the New South Wales Turridae (Mollusca). Australian Zoological Handbook. Sydney : Royal Zoological Society of New South Wales 1-56, pls 1-12.

External links
 Simon Grove and Robert de Little: New Tasmanian records and range extensions for marine molluscs (2014)

ordinata
Gastropods of Australia
Gastropods described in 1954